Botswana National Sports Commission is the national governing body for all sports in Botswana.

See also 
 Sports in Botswana
 Botswana National Olympic Committee(BNOC)
 Botswana Tennis Association
 Botswana national football team
 Botswana Cycling Association

References

External links 
 Official website of BNSC
 Official website of Botswana

Sport in Botswana
Sport